This article contains information about the literary events and publications of 1906.

Events

February 8 – The writer Hilaire Belloc becomes a Liberal Member of Parliament of the United Kingdom.
February 15 – J. M. Dent and Co. initiates the U.K. Everyman's Library series, edited by Ernest Rhys. The first title is Boswell's Life of Johnson.
March 13 – The Romanian nationalist historian Nicolae Iorga instigates a boycott of the National Theater Bucharest over its staging of French-language plays. A riot ensues.
April 10–October 13 – Maxim Gorky visits the United States with his mistress, the actress Maria Andreyeva, to raise funds for the Bolsheviks. In the Adirondack Mountains he writes his novel of revolutionary conversion and struggle, The Mother (Mat'''). The couple then move to Capri.
April 18 – The 1906 San Francisco earthquake destroys the unfinished premises of Stanford University Library. Many of the city's leading poets and writers retreat to join the arts colony at Carmel-by-the-Sea, California known as The Barness.
May–October – Jack London's novel White Fang is serialized in the American magazine Outing.
June – Virginia Stephen, the future Virginia Woolf, writes her first work of fiction, a short story which becomes known as "Phyllis and Rosamond" when first published, posthumously.
July 11 – The Murder of Grace Brown in Herkimer County, New York will inspire Theodore Dreiser's novel An American Tragedy (1925) and Jennifer Donnelly's young-adult novel A Northern Light (2003).
Pre-September – The last full-scale court performance of gambuh dance-drama is held in Bali.
September 1 – Annie Carroll Moore begins work as Superintendent of the Department of Work with Children at the New York Public Library.
September 18 – August Strindberg's naturalist drama Miss Julie (Fröken Julie), written in 1888, is first performed on the Swedish professional stage, on tour in Lund, directed by August Falck, with Manda Bjorling in the title rôle and August Palme as Jean. It is first staged in Stockholm on December 13 at the Folkan (People's Theatre).
November 8 – Max Reinhardt inaugurates the Kammerspiele series of new plays at the Deutsches Theater in Berlin, with a production of Ghosts by Henrik Ibsen, designed by Edvard Munch.
November 20 – Frank Wedekind's play Spring Awakening: A Children's Tragedy (Frühlings Erwachen), completed 1901, receives its first staging, as the second work presented in the Deutsches Theater's Kammerspiele series in Berlin, directed by Max Reinhardt.
December 24 – Reginald Fessenden transmits the first radio program, a poetry reading, a violin solo, and a speech, from Brant Rock, Massachusetts.unknown datesLivraria Lello & Irmão opens a new bookstore in Porto (Portugal).
The magazine Eesti Kirjandus (Estonian Literature) is founded in the Governorate of Estonia, as part of the Estonian national awakening.

New books

Fiction
Pio Baroja – Paradox, rey (King Paradox)
Rex Beach – The Spoilers Godfrey Benson – Tracks in the Snow Marjorie Bowen – The Viper of MilanHall Caine – Drink: A Love Story on a Great QuestionPaul Carus – AmitabhaMary Cholmondeley – PrisonersWilliam De Morgan – Joseph VanceArthur Conan Doyle – Sir NigelDouglas Morey Ford – A Time of Terror: The Story of a Great Revenge (A.D. 1910)Ford Madox Ford – The Fifth QueenZona Gale – Romance IslandJohn Galsworthy – The Man of PropertyEllen Glasgow – The Wheel of LifeElinor Glyn – Beyond the RocksRemy de Gourmont – Une Nuit au Luxembourg (A Night in the Luxembourg)
O. Henry – The Four MillionHermann Hesse – Beneath the Wheel (Unterm Rad) Robert Hichens –  The Call of the BloodMikhail Kuzmin – Wings («Крылья»)
William John Locke – The Beloved VagabondArthur Machen – The House of SoulsGeorge Moore – My Dead LifeRobert Musil – The Confusions of Young Törless (Die Verwirrungen des Zöglings Törless)Natsume Sōseki (夏目 漱石)Botchan (坊っちゃん)Kusamakura (草枕, Grass Pillow)Shumi no Iden (趣味の遺伝, The Heredity of Taste)
 E. Phillips Oppenheim – A Lost LeaderBaroness OrczyI Will RepayA Son of the PeopleDavid M. Parry – The Scarlet Empire Rafael Sabatini – Bardelys the MagnificentFelix Salten (attributed) – Josephine MutzenbacherUpton Sinclair – The JungleRabindranath Tagore – Naukadubi (The Wreck)
Mary Augusta Ward – Fenwick's CareerH. G. Wells – In the Days of the CometOwen Wister – Lady BaltimoreP. G. Wodehouse – Love Among the ChickensChildren and young people
L. Frank BaumJohn Dough and the CherubAnnabel (as Suzanne Metcalf)Aunt Jane's Nieces (as Edith Van Dyne)Daughters of Destiny (as Schuyler Staunton)Sam Steele's Adventures on Land and Sea (as Capt. Hugh Fitzgerald)The Twinkle Tales (as Laura Bancroft)
Angela Brazil – The Fortunes of PhilippaNorman Duncan – The Adventures of Billy TopsailRudyard Kipling – Puck of Pook's HillSelma Lagerlöf – The Wonderful Adventures of Nils (Nils Holgerssons underbara resa genom Sverige)Jack London – White FangFerenc Molnár – A Pál utcai fiúk (The Paul Street Boys)Ferenc Móra – Öreg diófák alatt (Beneath Old Walnut Trees)
Edith NesbitThe Railway Children (book publication)The Story of the AmuletBeatrix PotterThe Tale of Mr. Jeremy FisherThe Story of a Fierce Bad RabbitThe Story of Miss MoppetDrama
Hall Caine – The Bondman Play
 Benjamin Chapin – Lincoln
Paul Claudel – Partage de midi (The Break of Midnight, published)
Owen Davis – Nellie, the Beautiful Cloak Model
John Galsworthy – The Silver Box
Paul Gavault and Robert Charvay – Mademoiselle Josette, My Woman
Maxim Gorky – Barbarians
Harley Granville-Barker – Waste (refused public performance licence in UK)
Sacha Guitry – Chez les Zoaques
Winifred Mary Letts – The Eyes of the Blind
George Barr McCutcheon – Brewster's Millions (adaptation)
Emma Orczy (Baroness Orczy) – The Sin of William Jackson

Poetry

Mikhail Kuzmin – Alexandrian SongsNon-fiction
Lord Acton (died 1902) – Lectures on Modern HistoryHenry Adams – The Education of Henry AdamsHall Caine – My StoryJoseph Conrad – The Mirror of the Sea: Memories and ImpressionsPercy Dearmer and Ralph Vaughan Williams (eds) – The English HymnalHenry Watson Fowler and Francis George Fowler – The King's EnglishOkakura Kakuzō – The Book of Tea (in English)
Robert Sherard – The Life of Oscar WildeMark Twain – What Is Man?Helen Zimmern – The Italy of the Italians''

Births
January 6 – Eberhard Wolfgang Möller, German playwright and poet (died 1972)
January 9 – Barbara Sleigh, English children's writer (died 1982)
January 19 – Robin Hyde (Iris Guiver Wilkinson), New Zealand poet and novelist (died 1939)
January 22 – Robert E. Howard, American fantasy author (died 1936)
January 23 – Anya Seton, American romantic author (died 1990)
February 8 – Henry Roth, American novelist and short story writer (died 1995)
February 13 – Máirtín Ó Cadhain, Irish language writer (died 1970)
February 15 – Musa Cälil, Soviet Tatar poet (died 1944)
March 25 – A. J. P. Taylor, English historian (died 1990)
April 13 – Samuel Beckett, Irish writer Nobel laureate (died 1989)
May 8 – Esther Hoffe, Israeli mistress of Max Brod (died 2007)
May 9 – Eleanor Estes, American librarian, author and illustrator (died 1988)
May 22 – Lesbia Soravilla, Cuban writer (died 1989)
June 23 – Wolfgang Koeppen, German novelist (died 1996)
June 27
 Catherine Cookson, English popular novelist (died 1998)
 Vernon Watkins, Welsh poet (died 1967)
July 4 – Margaret Douglas-Home, English writer and musician (died 1996)
July 18 – Clifford Odets, American dramatist (died 1963)
August 28 – John Betjeman, English poet laureate (died 1984)
August 30 – Elizabeth Longford, English biographer (died 2002)
September 1 – Eleanor Hibbert, English romantic novelist under several pseudonyms (died 1993)
September 25 – Franklin Garrett, American local historian (died 2000)
September 27 – William Empson, English poet and literary critic (died 1984)
30 September – J. I. M. Stewart, Scottish-born novelist and academic critic (died 1994)
October 10 – R. K. Narayan, Indian novelist writing in English (died 2001)
October 16 – Dino Buzzati, Italian author (died 1972)
October 14 – Hannah Arendt, German-American intellectual (died 1975)
November 12 – George Dillon, American editor and poet (died 1968)
November 13 – John Sparrow, English literary scholar (died 1992)
November 18 – Klaus Mann, German-born novelist (died 1949)
November 29 – Barbara C. Freeman, English writer and poet (died 1999)
November 30 – John Dickson Carr, American detective fiction writer (died 1977)

Deaths
February 9 – Paul Laurence Dunbar, American poet, novelist and playwright (born 1872)
March 1 – Lettie S. Bigelow, American poet and author (born 1849)
March 2 – Ellen Mary Clerke, English novelist, poet and writer on astronomy (born 1840)
March 20
Vasile Pogor, Moldavian/Romanian poet, scholar and politician (born 1833)
A. D. T. Whitney, American poet and girls' writer (born 1824)
April 6 – Alexander Kielland, Norwegian novelist (born 1849)
April 11 – Francis Pharcellus Church, American editor and publisher (born 1839)
April 14 – Nora Chesson, English poet (born 1871)
May 5 – Eliza Brightwen, Scottish naturalist (born 1830)
May 23 – Henrik Ibsen, Norwegian playwright (born 1828)
June 29 – Albert Sorel, French historian (born 1842)
June 30 – Jean Lorrain, French Symbolist poet (born 1855)
August 17 – Elizabeth Missing Sewell, English novelist and educationist (born 1815)
August 19 – Agnes Catherine Maitland, English academic, novelist and cookery writer (born 1850)
September 10 – Rose Porter, American religious novelist (born 1845)
September 24 – Charlotte Riddell, Anglo-Irish novelist and editor (born 1832)
October 9 – Wilhelmina FitzClarence, Countess of Munster, English novelist (born 1830)
December 6 – Anne Ross Cousin, English poet (born 1824)

Awards
Nobel Prize for Literature: Giosuè Carducci

References

 
Years of the 20th century in literature